

Regularly scheduled events 
 AMA Supercross
 Anime Matsuri
 ApolloCon
 Bayou City Art Festival (formerly the Westheimer Colony Arts Festival)
 Comicpalooza
 Free Press Summer Fest
 Frontier Fiesta
 Houston Art Car Parade
 Houston Auto Show
 Houston Gay and Lesbian Film Festival
 Houston Gay Pride Parade
 Houston Greek Festival
 Houston International Festival (I-Fest)
 Houston Livestock Show and Rodeo
 Houston Marathon
 Juneteenth
 Shell Houston Open
 Texas Renaissance Festival
 Westheimer Street Festival (no longer held biannually since October 17, 2004; the replacement festival, WestFest Compressed, was held in October 2005)

One-time events 

 1992 Republican National Convention
 Rendez-vous Houston
 World Wrestling Entertainment (WWE)'s WrestleMania X-Seven on April 1, 2001
 World Wrestling Entertainment (WWE)'s WrestleMania XXV on April 5, 2009

See also

 
Houston
H
Events